Cihangir (also known as Hemmeşe) is a village in the Çemişgezek District, Tunceli Province, Turkey. The village is populated by Kurds of the Şikakî tribe and had a population of 35 in 2021.

References 

Villages in Çemişgezek District